Wiktorzyn may refer to the following places:
Wiktorzyn, Bielsk County in Podlaskie Voivodeship (north-east Poland)
Wiktorzyn, Łomża County in Podlaskie Voivodeship (north-east Poland)
Wiktorzyn, Wysokie Mazowieckie County in Podlaskie Voivodeship (north-east Poland)
Wiktorzyn, Masovian Voivodeship (east-central Poland)